The Greenville-New Bern-Kinston Combined Statistical Area, as defined by the United States Census Bureau, is an area consisting of seven counties in Eastern North Carolina. As of the 2011 census, the CSA had a population of 427,723 (though a July 1, 2009 estimate placed the population at 399,848).

Counties
Pitt 171,134
Craven 104,786
Lenoir 59,339
Beaufort 47,691
Greene 21,556
Pamlico 13,197
Jones 10,020

Communities

Places with more than 85,000 inhabitants
Greenville (Anchor city)

Places with 10,000 to 50,000 inhabitants
New Bern 29,899
Kinston 21,622
Havelock 20,699
Winterville 10,791
Farmville 10,012
Washington 10,282

Places with 1,000 to 10,000 inhabitants
Ayden 
Bethel 
Grifton 
Belhaven 
La Grange 
James City (census-designated place)
Brices Creek (census-designated place)
Fairfield Harbour (census-designated place)
Maysville
Neuse Forest (census-designated place)
River Bend
Trent Woods

Places with less than 1,000 inhabitants
Pink Hill 
Aurora 
Chocowinity 
Alliance
Bayboro
Grantsboro 
Oriental
Vanceboro
Arapahoe
Bridgeton
Cove City
Dover
Mesic
Minnesott Beach
Pollocksville
Stonewall
Trenton
Vandemere

Demographics
As of the census of 2011, there were 427,723 people, 302,604 households, and 294,261 families residing within the CSA. The racial makeup of the MSA was 91.49% White, 5.15% African American, 0.37% Native American, 0.56% Asian, 0.03% Pacific Islander, 1.33% from other races, and 1.06% from two or more races. Hispanic or Latino of any race were 3.15% of the population.

The median income for a household in the MSA was $74,921, and the median income for a family was $61,952. Males had a median income of $60,308 versus $53,069 for females. The per capita income for the MSA was $49,031.

Combined Statistical Area
The Greenville-New Bern-Kinston CSA is made up of seven counties in eastern North Carolina.

See also
North Carolina census statistical areas
List of cities, towns, and villages in North Carolina
List of unincorporated communities in North Carolina

References 

Combined statistical areas of the United States